KWKQ is a commercial radio station located in Graham, Texas, broadcasting on 94.7 FM.  KWKQ airs a classic rock music format.

It is owned by Terry and Kay Slavens, through licensee For the Love of the Game Broadcasting, LLC.

References

External links
Q94-7 Online
Q94-7 on Facebook

WKQ
Classic rock radio stations in the United States
Radio stations established in 1975
1975 establishments in Texas